Attack Records ran originally from 1969 to 1980 as an imprint of Trojan Records. Notable artists included The Pioneers, Gregory Isaacs, I-Roy, Big Youth and The Upsetters.

In 2003 it was revived for British singer Morrissey and the label Sanctuary Records, to persuade him to release his comeback album, You Are the Quarry with Sanctuary, despite the singer feeling that the name Sanctuary was inappropriate. Artists on the Attack roster included Morrissey, Nancy Sinatra, Jobriath and Kristeen Young. Morrissey's 2004 album, You Are the Quarry has sold in excess of 700,000 copies for the label.

In 2007, Sanctuary was sold to Universal, with Morrissey shifting to Decca Records. His last record under Attack was a partnership with Lost Highway Records in the US for the release of Years of Refusal, as he had earlier left Decca in the US due to its "poor promotion" of his 2008 Greatest Hits. Following this time, he was left without a record label worldwide (akin to the period of his career between 1997 and 2004). Morrissey later signed to Capitol in 2014.

See also
 List of record labels
 List of independent UK record labels

References

Record labels established in 1969
Record labels disestablished in 1980
Record labels established in 2003
Re-established companies
British independent record labels
Vanity record labels
Indie rock record labels